Harpster is a surname. Notable people with the surname include:

Howard Harpster (1907–1980), American football player and coach
Julia Jacobs Harpster (1846–1935), American missionary 
Noah Harpster (born 1976), American actor, writer, producer, and director